David Hirst is the name of:
David Hirst (judge) (1925–2011), English Lord Justice of Appeal, 1992–1999
David Hirst (journalist) (born 1936), Middle East correspondent based in Beirut
David Hirst (footballer) (born 1967), former football player, played for Sheffield Wednesday
David Hirst (arachnologist), described many species of huntsman spider, South Australian Museum in Adelaide

See also
David Hurst (born 1926), British-German actor, best known as Rudolph the headwaiter in Hello, Dolly